Abakan is the capital city of the Republic of Khakassia, Russia.

Abakan may also refer to:
Abakan Urban Okrug, a municipal formation which the City of Abakan in the Republic of Khakassia, Russia
Abakan River, a river in Krasnoyarsk Krai, Russia
Abakan International Airport, an airport in the Republic of Khakassia, Russia
Abakan-Avia, a Russian cargo airlines
Abakan Range, a Siberian mountain range in Russia
Abakan, alternative name of AN-94, a modern Russian assault rifle
Abakans, fiber sculptures of Polish artist, Magdalena Abakanowicz
Project Abakan, assault rifle selection trials held in Russia